Newlyweds are people who recently got married.

Newlyweds may also refer to:

 Newlyweds (film), a 2011 film written and directed by Edward Burns
 Newlyweds (TV series), an Australian sitcom from 1993 to 1994
 Newlyweds: Nick and Jessica, an American reality television series about Nick Lachey and Jessica Simpson
 Newlyweds: The First Year, an American reality documentary television series that premiered on Bravo in 2013
 The Newlywed Game, an American game show